The 2017–18 Major Arena Soccer League 2 season is the first season for the league M2. The regular season started on December 2, 2017, and ended on March 4, 2018. Each team will play a 12-game schedule.

Standings
As of March 4, 2018

(Bold) Division Winner

Eastern Conference

Western Conference

2018 M2 Championship
The top three teams from each division qualified for the post-season. The championship will be a single elimination playoff to be held at the SoccerHaus in Colorado Springs, Colorado except the Western Conference Semi-Final, which will be played in San Diego.

Conference Semi-Finals

Conference Finals

3rd Place Game

Final

Awards

Individual Awards

All-League First Team

All-League Second Team

References

External links
MASL2 official website

Major Arena Soccer League
 
Major Arena Soccer League